Eric Lloyd (born David Eric Lloyd Morelli; May 19, 1986) is an American actor, musician, and producer. Lloyd is best known for work as a child actor in such roles as Charlie Calvin in Disney's The Santa Clause film trilogy and the follow-up series The Santa Clauses, as well as "Little John" Warner in the NBC television series Jesse, and Kyle Grant in Dunston Checks In.

Career
His television career began when, between ages two and five, he was cast as a young Kevin Arnold (Fred Savage) in episodes of The Wonder Years. His film credits include Batman & Robin, Dunston Checks In, My Giant, The Brave Little Toaster Goes to Mars, and The Brave Little Toaster to the Rescue.

In 2015, Lloyd opened Lloyd Production Studios. LP Studios is a production and post-production music and film space located in Glendale, California.

Recognition
In 1996, the Fort Worth Star-Telegram wrote, "Eric Lloyd is a few years shy of adolescence, but already he has the credentials of a veteran actor," stating that at that time his biggest role was in The Santa Clause, but that his role in Dunston Checks In put him "back in the thick of things".

Filmography

Film

Television

Video games

Awards and nominations
 1993, Nominated for Young Artist Award for Outstanding Actor Under Ten in a Television Series for Laurie Hill
 1994, Nominated for Young Artist Award for Best Actor Under Ten in a Motion Picture for Heart and Souls
 1994, Nominated for Young Artist Award for Best Performance by a Young Actor Co-Starring in a Motion Picture for The Santa Clause
 1995, Nominated for Young Artist Award for Best Performance by a Youth Actor in a TV Mini-Series or Special for Seasons of the Heart
 1997, Nominated for Young Artist Award for Best Performance in a Feature Film – Actor Age Ten or Under for Dunston Checks In
 1998, Nominated for Young Artist Award for Best Performance in a TV Movie/Pilot/Mini-Series – Young Actor Age Ten or Under for A Christmas Memory
 1999, Nominated for Young Artist Award for Best Performance in a TV Movie/Pilot/Mini-Series or Series – Supporting Young Actor for Chameleon
 1999, Won Young Artist Award for Best Performance in a TV Comedy Series – Supporting Young Actor for Jesse
 1999, Nominated for The Hollywood Reporter Young Star Award for Best Performance by a Young Actor in a Comedy TV Series for Jesse
 2000, Nominated for Young Artist Award for Best Performance in a TV Comedy Series – Supporting Young Actor for Jesse
 2000, Nominated for The Hollywood Reporter Young Star Award for Best Young Actor/Performance in a Comedy TV Series for Jesse
 2003, Nominated for Young Artist Award for Best Performance in a Feature Film – Supporting Young Actor for The Santa Clause 2: The Mrs. Clause
 2007, Nominated for Young Artist Award for Best Young Ensemble in a Feature Film for The Santa Clause 3: The Escape Clause

References

External links
 Eric Lloyd official site
 

1986 births
Living people
American male comedians
Male actors from Glendale, California
American male child actors
American male film actors
American male voice actors
American male television actors
Chapman University alumni
20th-century American male actors
21st-century American male actors
Comedians from California
20th-century American comedians
21st-century American comedians
Disney people